The 1956 Missouri lieutenant gubernatorial election was held on November 6, 1956. Democratic nominee Edward V. Long defeated Republican nominee Richard M. Webster with 53.49% of the vote.

Primary elections
Primary elections were held on August 7, 1956.

Democratic primary

Candidates
Edward V. Long, State Senator
Tom A. Shockley
Harry E. Kemp
Charles C. Hurst
John Hosmer
Samuel Van D. Williams

Results

General election

Candidates
Edward V. Long, Democratic
Richard M. Webster, Republican

Results

References

1956
Gubernatorial
Missouri